List of bays and coves of Jamaica:

A bay is a body of water forming an indentation along the shoreline of a landmass, larger than a cove (i.e. Jade Cove) but smaller than a gulf (i.e. The Gulf or The Gulf of Mexico)

Cagway Bay
Orange Bay (Hanover Parish)
Orange Bay (Portland Parish)
Xtabi

The following are bays in Jamaica:

Buff Bay
i Montego Bay 
i Discovery Bay 
i Morant Bay 
Old Harbour Bay (OFFICIAL)
Boston Bay (Coast of Portland) 
Runaway Bay
Bull Bay

Key: i Not official. Mainly put because of 'Bay' at the ending...

 
Bays
Jamaica